Rashed Khalil Ebrahim Talha Khalil Al-Hooti (born 24 December 1989) is a Bahraini professional footballer who plays as a defender. He plays for the Bahrain national football team. He was a member of the Bahrain squad at the 2011 and 2015 AFC Asian Cups. and he is the current holder of the title of fastest red card in international match history. On 11 October 2011 against Iran in 2014 World Cup qualifier match he was carded in 39 seconds.

References

External links
 
 

1989 births
Living people
Bahraini footballers
2011 AFC Asian Cup players
2015 AFC Asian Cup players
Bahrain international footballers
Footballers at the 2010 Asian Games
Sportspeople from Manama

Association football fullbacks
Asian Games competitors for Bahrain
AFC Cup winning players